Gavril Krastevich (5 April 1817 – 19 November 1898) was a Bulgarian politician and historian, and the first translator of Benjamin Franklin into Bulgarian. He was born in Kotel in 1817.

He was Governor General of Eastern Rumelia between 1884 and 1885 when it was part of the Ottoman Empire. Krastevich died in Istanbul on 16 November 1898.

Honorary member of the Bulgarian Academy of Sciences.

References

Bulgarian politicians
Governors-general
Governors-General of Eastern Rumelia
Members of the Bulgarian Academy of Sciences
People from Kotel, Bulgaria
1817 births
1898 deaths
19th-century Bulgarian people